The Toucheng Old Street is a street in Toucheng Township, Yilan County, Taiwan.

Name
Toucheng means First Town literally. It is used to be known as Touwei Street.

History
Toucheng Old Street was used to be known as Touwei Street in early times. It was established during the Qing Dynasty rule. The area around the street used to be an important trading district with the booming river and harbor transportation sector, especially the Wushih and Touwei Harbors.

The decline in this area started with the 1878 flood which affected Wushih Harbor. An American ship sank and subsequently blocked the entrance of the harbor in 1883. Although the harbor function was partially moved to Toucheng Harbor, the harbor was also flooded in 1924. With also the completion of highways and railway, especially the opening of Hsuehshan Tunnel, as well as the shifting of business center elsewhere, make this old street lost its fame.

Architecture

Buildings along the street show the history of Taiwan architectural history, in which there are old buildings with various architectural styles. Recently, the old street has been undergoing transformation to have more artworks installed along the corridor with 3D paintings sponsored by the central government for the amount of NT$9 million, which is expected to be completed by December 2018.

Transportation
The street is accessible within walking distance south east from Toucheng Station of Taiwan Railways Administration.

See also
 List of roads in Taiwan

References

Streets in Taiwan
Tourist attractions in Yilan County, Taiwan